The women's pole vault event  at the 1996 European Athletics Indoor Championships was held in Stockholm Globe Arena on 8 March. It was the first time that this event was held at the European Indoor Championships and was one of the first major international pole vault competitions for women.

Results

References

Final results

Pole vault at the European Athletics Indoor Championships
Pole
1996 in women's athletics